Sabine Haudepin (born 19 October 1955) is a French actress. She has appeared in more than 50 films since 1962. She was born in Montreuil, Seine-Saint-Denis, France.

Filmography

References

External links

1955 births
Living people
French film actresses
People from Montreuil, Seine-Saint-Denis
20th-century French actresses